The 2022 Nevada Attorney General election took place on November 8, 2022, to elect the Attorney General of Nevada. Incumbent Democratic Attorney General Aaron Ford won re-election to a second term in office. 2022 was the first time since 2014 that a Democrat has won a county or county-equivalent outside of Clark or Washoe County, as Ford narrowly won Carson City.

Democratic primary

Candidates

Nominee
Aaron D. Ford, incumbent attorney general

Disqualified
Stuart MacKie, attorney and candidate for Governor of Nevada in 2018

Endorsements

Republican primary

Candidates

Nominee
Sigal Chattah, defense attorney and former member of the Southern Nevada Disciplinary Board of the State Bar of Nevada

Eliminated in primary 
Tisha Black, attorney and former president of the Nevada Cannabis Association

Polling

Results

Libertarian primary
Kennedy was disqualified from running after he did not meet the requirement for candidates to be members of the State Bar of Nevada. As Kennedy was disqualified after general election ballots had already been printed, Kennedy remained on the ballot, but any votes Kennedy received did not count.

Candidates

Declared
John T. Kennedy

General election

Predictions

Endorsements

Polling

Results

See also
Nevada Attorney General

Notes

References

External links
Official campaign websites
Sigal Chattah (R) for Attorney General
Aaron Ford (D) for Attorney General

Attorney General
Nevada
Nevada Attorney General elections